The 1947 Wake Forest Demon Deacons football team was an American football team that represented Wake Forest University during the 1947 college football season. In its 11th season under head coach Peahead Walker, the team compiled a 6–4 record and finished in tenth place in the Southern Conference.

Guard Edward Royston was selected by the Associated Press as a first-team player on the 1947 All-Southern Conference football team.

Schedule

References

Wake Forest
Wake Forest Demon Deacons football seasons
Wake Forest Demon Deacons football